Mavrak may refer to:

People

 Antun Mavrak (1899-1938), Croatian revolutionary and secretary of the Communist Party of Yugoslavia from Aug. 1930 to April 1932
 Béla Mavrák (b. 1966), Hungarian tenor singer
 Darko Mavrak (b. 1969), Yugoslav footballer